Aaron Michlewitz is a Democratic member of the Massachusetts House of Representatives from the 3rd Suffolk District, within the city of Boston, Massachusetts. The 3rd Suffolk District encompasses the North End, Waterfront, Chinatown, South End, Financial District, Bay Village, Leather District, and parts of Beacon Hill, and Back Bay neighborhoods.

Michlewitz was elected in a special election following the resignation of Salvatore DiMasi in 2009. 

Prior to the election, Michlewitz worked for the Former Speaker of the Massachusetts House of Representatives Sal DiMasi as his Constituent Services Director from 2004 until DiMasi's resignation on January 27, 2009.

Michlewitz is currently serving his first term as the House Chairman of the Ways and Means Committee. He has previously served as Chairman of the Joint Committee on Financial Services, the Joint Committee on Public Service, and the Joint Committee on Election Laws.

In 2016, Michlewitz was a leading author of Massachusetts's landmark legislation dealing with Transportation Network Companies like Uber and Lyft . Michlewitz has also worked on crafting legislation that would regulate Short-Term residential rentals such as Airbnb

See also
 2019–2020 Massachusetts legislature
 2021–2022 Massachusetts legislature

References

External links
  Rep. Aaron M. Michlewitz at the Massachusetts Legislature
 Representative Aaron Michlewitz campaign site

Living people
Democratic Party members of the Massachusetts House of Representatives
21st-century American politicians
Northeastern University alumni
Politicians from Boston
People from North End, Boston
1978 births